A sea eagle is a bird of prey in the genus Haliaeetus.

Sea eagle may also refer to:

Birds
 Brahminy kite, also called red-backed sea eagle
 Osprey, known as the sea eagle chiefly in heraldry

Aerospace
 Sea Eagle (missile), British, anti-ship missile
 Sea Eagle (WIG craft)
 Supermarine Sea Eagle, 1920s British passenger flying boat

Sports
 Blackpool Sea Eagles, English rugby league football club
 Manly-Warringah Sea Eagles, Australian rugby league football club
 North Harbour Sea Eagles, New Zealand rugby league club
 Papakura Sea Eagles, New Zealand rugby league club
 Sunshine Coast Sea Eagles, Australian, professional rugby league football team
Samoa national rugby union team

Other
 HMS Sea Eagle, former, Royal Navy shore establishment near Derry, Northern Ireland
 Operation Sea Eagle, 1941, cancelled German supply operation in support of the Irish Republican Army
 The Sea Eagle, 1946 novel by James Aldridge
 SS Sea Eagle, ship. See USS Custer (APA-40)

See also
Fish eagle (disambiguation)